P'unquchayuq (Quechua p'unqu pond, reservoir, tank; dam, -cha, -yuq suffixes, "the one with a little pond (or dam)", Hispanicized spelling Puncuchayoc) is a mountain in the Cusco Region in Peru, about  high. It is situated in the Calca Province, San Salvador District, and in the Paucartambo Province, Caicay District. P'unquchayuq lies south of Hatun Punta and southeast of Qhiwar.

References 

Mountains of Peru
Mountains of Cusco Region